Jeanne Hatto (30 January 1879 – 26 March 1958) was a French operatic soprano.

Biography 
Hatto was born in Saint-Amour-Bellevue in Burgundy in 1879, and studied in Lyon and at the Conservatoire de Paris under Victor Warot. She made her début at the Paris Opéra in 1899. Her repertoire ranged from Rameau to Wagner. 

In the New Grove Dictionary of Opera, David Cummings writes of Hatto, "Her powerful voice and commanding stage presence made her a favourite in the dramatic repertory". Among her mainstream roles listed in that article are Elisabeth in Tannhäuser, Sieglinde in Die Walküre, Marguerite in Faust and Donna Elvira in Don Giovanni. In less familiar repertoire she played Telaira in Rameau's Castor et Pollux, and Diana in the same composer's Hippolyte et Aricie and the title role in Ernest Reyer's  Salammbô. She created roles in operas by Camille Saint-Saëns (Les barbares, 1901), Xavier Leroux (Astarté, 1901) and Ernest Chausson  (Le roi Arthus, 1903).

In 1904 Hatto was the soloist in the first performance of Ravel's song cycle Shéhérazade, and was the dedicatee of the first and longest song of the cycle, "Asie".

A road in Hatto's native town is named in her honour.

References

External links 

1879 births
1958 deaths
Musicians from Lyon
Conservatoire de Paris alumni
French operatic mezzo-sopranos